is the eleventh single of the Japanese boy band Arashi and their second double A-side single. The single was released in two editions: a regular edition containing the karaoke versions of all the songs released in the single, and a limited edition with a deluxe cover art.

Single information
"Hadashi no Mirai" was used as the campaign song for Coca-Cola and is evident on the cover art design for the limited edition. "Kotoba yori Taisetsu na Mono" was used as the theme song for the drama Stand Up!! starring Arashi member Kazunari Ninomiya, NEWS member Tomohisa Yamashita, Anne Suzuki, Hiroki Narimiya and Shun Oguri.

Track list

Charts and certifications

Charts

Certifications

References

External links
 Hadashi No Mirai/Kotoba Yori Taisetsu na Mono product information  
 Hadashi No Mirai/Kotoba Yori Taisetsu na Mono Oricon profile 

Arashi songs
2003 singles
Japanese television drama theme songs
Songs written by Sho Sakurai